Regal is an unincorporated community in northeast Ray County, in the U.S. state of Missouri.

The community is at the intersection of Missouri routes A and W approximately fifteen miles northeast of Richmond. Wakenda Creek flows past one mile to the southwest of the community.

History
A post office called Regal was established in 1899, and remained in operation until 1904. The community was named Regal on account of the name's brevity.

References

Unincorporated communities in Ray County, Missouri
Unincorporated communities in Missouri